Deok-Kyo Oh (born 14 December 1952) is a South Korean theologian who served as the president of Hapdong Theological Seminary in South Korea and the president of the International University of Ulaanbaatar in Mongolia., and is a member of South Korea's National Unification Advisory Council since 2014.

Education and career 
Deokkyo Oh was born in Boryeong, South Chungcheong Province, South Korea in 1952. He studied theology at Chongshin University (BA), Graduate School of Theology (M.Div.), and graduate school (Th.M.). He was ordained as a pastor at the Chungnam Presbytery Church in 1978. He joined the Air Force to serve as the chaplain of the Air Force until 1981. He worked as a full-time lecturer at Chongshin University School of Theology in 1981. In September 1982 he began to study in Westminster Theological Seminary in Philadelphia.
In 1987 he became the first Korean to get Ph.D. in Westminster Theological Seminary. His dissertation title was "the Churches Resurrection : John Cotton’s Eschatological Understanding of the Ecclesiastical Reformation".
After returning to South Korea, he taught church history for 27 years. From 2005 to 2009, he served as the 7th President of Hapdong Theological Seminary. He was a research fellow at Yale University Divinity School in 1986, and visiting professor at Westminster Theological Seminary in 1992-1993, and  Stellenbosch University of South Africa in 2000. He was the president of the Presbyterian Theological Society of Korea in 2014. From February 2014 to 2017, he served as the President of the International University of Ulaanbaatar in Mongolia. In recognition of its contribution to the development of the Mongolian education, the Mongolian government gave him the best educator award in 2017.
He was nominated as the theologian of the year from the Memorial Association of the 500th anniversary of the birth of John Calvin. Since 2015 he has been a member of South Korea's National Unification Advisory Council. He is a member of the editorial committee for Unio cum Christo: An International Reformed Journal on Faith and Life.

Academic degrees

 Chongshin University (1975), BA
 Chongshin University (1978,), M. Div.
 Chongshin University (1981), Th. M.
 Westminster Theological Seminary (1987), Ph. D.

Works (books)

 The Churches Resurrection: John Cotton's Eschatological Understanding of The Ecclesiastical Reformation." Westminster Theological Seminary (Ph.D. 1987) (English)
 『청교도와 교회개혁』(합신대학원출판부)
  『장로교회사』(합신대학원출판부)
  『빈야드 운동 무엇이 문제인가』(교회와 신앙)
  『종교개혁사』(합신대학원출판부)
  『청교도 이야기』(이레서원)
  『언덕위의 도시: 청교도의 사회 개혁 이상』(합신대학원출판부)
  『개혁신학과 한국교회』(합신대학원출판부)

References

1952 births
Living people
21st-century Calvinist and Reformed Christians
Westminster Theological Seminary alumni
South Korean Calvinist and Reformed Christians
South Korean theologians
People from Boryeong
South Korean expatriates in Mongolia
Academic staff of Hapdong Theological Seminary